Operculum may refer to:

Human biology 
Operculum (brain), the part of the brain covering the insula
Operculum (dentistry), a small flap of tissue which may cover an erupting or partially erupted molar
Cervical mucus plug, the cervical mucus plug that blocks the cervix of the uterus after conception

Animal biology 
 Operculum (animal), a structure resembling a lid or a small door that opens and closes
 Operculum (bird), a structure which covers the nares of some birds
 Operculum (bryozoa), a lid on the orifice of some bryozoans
 Operculum (fish), a flap covering the gills of bony fish
 Operculum (gastropod), a sort of trapdoor used to close the aperture of some snails
 Operculum papillare, the iris found in the eyes of elasmobranchs (skates, sharks, and rays)
 The anterior end of the puparium in some insects, through which the adult emerges; for example the wasp Stenogastrinae

Botany 
Operculum (botany), various lids and flaps pertaining to plants, algae, and fungi

See also 
Dehiscence (botany), the opening of a plant structure, such as a fruit, anther, or sporangium, to release its contents